Gymnopusin is a phenanthrenediol produced by the orchid Bulbophyllum gymnopus. It is also found in Bulbophyllum reptans and Maxillaria densa.

References

External links 
 Gymnopusin at kanaya.naist.jp/knapsack_jsp

Phenanthrenoids
Orchids